Vashon Linden Dita Neufville (born 18 July 1999) is an English professional footballer who last played as a left back for Walton Casuals.

Club career

West Ham United
Neufville joined West Ham United at U14 level from Chelsea, signing his first professional contract at the club in July 2016. On 4 January 2019, Neufville moved on loan to Newport County. He made his professional debut for Newport on 6 January 2019, in an FA Cup Third Round 2–1 win against Leicester City. Following two appearances for Newport, his loan period was terminated early on 3 April 2019. He was released by West Ham at the end of the 2018–19 season.

Atlético Ottawa
Neufville signed with Canadian Premier League side Atlético Ottawa on 24 March 2020. He made his debut on 15 August against York9, where he earned an assist on Ottawa's first ever goal and was also sent off as both teams played to a 2–2 draw.

Walton Casuals
In March 2022, he returned to England, signing with Walton Casuals.

Neufville was released by the club due to Walton Casuals being wound up in June 2022.

International career
He has represented England at under-16 and under-17 youth international levels.

Career statistics

References

1999 births
Living people
Association football defenders
English footballers
Footballers from Islington (district)
Black British sportspeople
English expatriate footballers
Expatriate soccer players in Canada
English expatriate sportspeople in Canada
West Ham United F.C. players
Newport County A.F.C. players
Atlético Ottawa players
Walton Casuals F.C. players
English Football League players
Canadian Premier League players
England youth international footballers